"Hoy Te Dejé De Amar" is a song recorded by Mexican singer Paulina Rubio for her third studio album El Tiempo Es Oro (1995). Written by Marco Flores and produced by Miguel Blasco was released as the album's third single on June 1995.

The song was first performed in June 1995 during Rubio's special appearance on the Mexican television program ¡En Vivo!, where he also performed other songs from her album El Tiempo Es Oro. To promote the song on television networks , this presentation was taken as the official video of "Hoy Te Dejé De Amar", however, it is not considered an official video clip in Rubio's videography.

The song later appeared on most of Rubio's major compilations including Top Hits (2001) and Mío, Paulina y Sus Éxitos (2006).

Track listing and formats
 Mexico CD, Single, Promo

 "Hoy Te Dejé De Amar" – 3:55

References

1995 singles
Paulina Rubio songs
Spanish-language songs
EMI Latin singles
Song recordings produced by Miguel Blasco
Songs written by Marco Flores (songwriter)